"Maniac" is a song from the 1983 film Flashdance that was written by Dennis Matkosky and its performer, Michael Sembello. The original idea for the song came to Matkosky while watching a news report on a serial killer, which inspired gruesome lyrics that he and Sembello expanded upon after finding a 1980 horror film with the same name. When Flashdance director Adrian Lyne grew attached to the demo of the song used during filming, his music supervisor Phil Ramone requested lyrics more appropriate for their story of a dancer and worked with Sembello to produce a new version for the soundtrack. The new recording was used for a scene in which protagonist Alexandra Owens trains rigorously at home.

After the film became a surprise success, a music video was made using scenes from the film and began airing on the cable channel MTV in May 1983, coinciding with the release of the single. The song spent two weeks at number one on the Billboard Hot 100 and performed well in several countries. Because its video was shown extensively on MTV and Flashdance became the third highest-grossing film of 1983 in the U.S., Hollywood began to see music videos as a profitable way to market films.

The song thrust Sembello into the spotlight for the first time with personal appearances to promote it and even won Matkosky and him a Grammy for their composition. He included "Maniac" on his debut album but made it clear that he would not be putting out a similar song just to capitalize on its success and that he wanted people to forget his hit record and focus on his latest material. Cover versions of the song cropped up in the UK, however, and one recording of a DJ rapping over a remix spent 10 weeks at number 1 in Ireland in 2000 and became the country's fifth biggest-selling single of all time.

Composition and recording
The general concept for what became the Flashdance hit came to songwriter Dennis Matkosky while watching a news report about a serial killer. He jokingly thought, "With my luck, this guy lives next door to me," and immediately jotted down the lyrics that came to mind: "He's a maniac. He just moved in next door. He'll kill your cat and nail it to the floor." He took the idea to his friend Michael Sembello, whose eyes widened with interest when he heard the title. As soon as Matkosky was seated at a piano, Sembello said, "All right. Hit the weirdest chord you know," and they began composing the music. Their inspiration for the bridge came from the Bloodrock song "D.O.A.", a number 36 hit on the Billboard Hot 100 in 1971 that recreated the two-tone siren used on ambulances in England at that time, and Sembello came up with the idea of using "Chopsticks" to introduce the instrumental portion of the song. Matkosky said, "We thought it was a joke because we weren't trying to write a song. We were trying to make our friends laugh."

Sembello recalled their usual process for situations where they needed more lyrics: "Whenever we get an idea, we start researching, but we didn't have Google." Matkosky found the 1980 slasher film Maniac and rented it to see if they could come up with more to put in the song. It did provide the additional lyrics they wanted, but the demo they recorded wound up on a tape sent to Phil Ramone, who was looking for songs to use in Flashdance. During the film's pre-production, the two-tone siren music used in the bridge stood out for the film's director, Adrian Lyne, who said, "One of the tunes I'd heard had a kind of a chime in it, that kind of 'bing-bong-bing-bong-bing-bong', like that, and I said, 'Let's use that. Let's use that as a kind of a motive, as a kind of a driving thing for a dance.'" Lyne had grown accustomed to using the music by the end of filming and wanted it in the final cut, so Ramone asked for lyrics to fit the movie and had Sembello re-record the song.

Music video
Before Flashdance was released on April 15, 1983, its distributor Paramount Pictures had doubts that it would do well at the box office. The May 7 issue of Cash Box, however, reported on the surprise success of the film and Paramount's plan to have Lyne take parts of scenes from it to create music videos to be shown on the cable channel MTV as well as on television programs and at other venues featuring such clips. "Maniac" was listed on the reports that MTV provided to Billboard that indicated what videos were in rotation on the cable network and made its first appearance there in the May 21 issue, which indicated that it had been added to their playlist as of May 11.

Release and commercial performance
The June 4, 1983, issue of Billboard magazine included the first appearance of the 7-inch single of "Maniac" on the Billboard Hot 100, where it spent 22 weeks, and the September 10 Billboard marked its first of 2 weeks as the most popular song in the US. It reached number 34 during its 8 weeks on the magazine's Top Rock Tracks chart that began in the July 30 issue, and also made a number 34 showing over the course of 9 weeks on the Adult Contemporary chart as of the September 3 Billboard. Their September 10 Chartbeat column bemoaned the latter appearance as a "sign of the times", noting that "AC clearly isn't just for Anne Murray anymore", an uncannily prescient assessment considering that the song went to number 1 on the Adult Contemporary and pop charts in Murray's native Canada just weeks later. It also made the top 10 on the pop charts in Australia, Germany, the Netherlands, New Zealand, Spain, and Switzerland. The 12-inch remix began 15 weeks on the Dance/Disco Top 80 in the June 25 Billboard and eventually got as high as number 6.

Critical reception

"Maniac" was selected as the best song on the soundtrack album by the editors of Digital Audios Guide to Compact Discs, who described how "it opens with a fast disco drum machine beat, augmented by frantic synthesizers and a pulsating bass line." In their retrospective reviews, AllMusic labeled the song as one of their Album Picks from the Flashdance soundtrack and the 1994 Casablanca Records Story compilation.

Awards and accolades
As a single, "Maniac" earned Sembello Grammy nominations for Record of the Year and Best Pop Vocal Performance, Male, and a nomination with Matkosky for Song of the Year. As part of the Flashdance soundtrack, it gave them and all of the songwriters who contributed to the album the Grammy Award for Best Album of Original Score Written for a Motion Picture or a Television Special, and Sembello was also nominated alongside all of the other performers on the soundtrack for Album of the Year. "Maniac" was nominated for the Academy Award and Golden Globe for Best Original Song, and the music video for "Maniac" was awarded Best Editing at Billboard magazine's Video Music Awards.

Live performances
Some of Sembello's appearances to promote "Maniac" included programs where performers would lip sync to the hit recording of their song, such as Solid Gold, where he appeared on June 18, and American Bandstand, which included a brief interview of him by Dick Clark, on September 10. At the 56th Academy Awards on April 9, 1984, the song was performed live by Lani Hall with Herb Alpert & the Tijuana Brass.

Legacy and influence

The extensive exposure that the "Maniac" video received from MTV and other outlets helped Paramount plug Flashdance for free instead of paying the several million dollars of commercial time for the standard television advertising exposure needed to get the same result. Paramount vice president Gordon Weaver described this approach as "invisible marketing". Flashdance went on to be the third highest-grossing film of 1983 in the US despite having unknown actors and receiving bad reviews, so the new priority for studio marketing departments became evaluating how practical it would be to include popular music in the projects they were looking to release in order to receive similar benefits from such outlets.

Aftermath
In 1983 Sembello said, "It's a funny irony that it caught on so, especially since I don't dance and have never even been to a disco." Later he expressed pride in having a number one record after working in the business for so many years, cautioning, "But, hey, let it die. 'Maniac' was just a song, and now I'm on to the next, and I don't want to rip off the record-buying public by doing a carbon-copy of 'Maniac' just to make some money." He chose to continue working with Ramone on his debut album, Bossa Nova Hotel, which included his number one single and gave him two more U.S. chart hits: the number 34 Hot 100 entry "Automatic Man" and "Talk", which reached number 25 on the Adult Contemporary chart.

In May 2010, Maniac director William Lustig interviewed Sembello and Matkosky to clear up the misconception that his film was what began the process of writing their song of the same name, and they confirmed that the story of how the song originated had been retold incorrectly over the years.

Personnel

Personnel adapted from the liner notes of the album Bossa Nova Hotel:
Michael Sembello – vocals, guitar, synthesizer bass, producer
Dennis Matkosky – keyboards, synthesizer
Carlos Vega – Simmons drums
Dennis Karmazyn – cello
Phil Ramone – producer

12-inch remix

Credits adapted from the liner notes of the 12-inch single:
John "Jellybean" Benitez – remixing
Jay Mark – engineer

Charts

Weekly charts

Year-end charts

Certifications

Cover versions
The rave act 4 Rhythm made a recording of "Maniac" in 1994 that replaced the verses with a more contemporary rap, but the publishers of the original, Warner Chappell Music, "weren't happy with the change of lyrics and blocked the release". They did allow a 4 Rhythm version in which the original verses were rapped, and that recording reached number 28, the same peak position that Sembello achieved, on the Irish Singles Chart in 1995. "Maniac 2000", a performance of Mark McCabe rapping over the 4 Rhythm version, spent ten weeks at number 1 on the Irish Singles Chart and became the country's fifth biggest-selling single of all time.

See also
 List of Billboard Hot 100 number-one singles of 1983
 List of number-one singles of 1983 (Canada)

Citations

General and cited references 
 
 
 
 
 
 
 
 
 
 

1983 debut singles
1983 songs
Michael Sembello songs
Billboard Hot 100 number-one singles
Casablanca Records singles
EMI Records singles
RPM Top Singles number-one singles
Song recordings produced by Phil Ramone
Songs written for films
Songs written by Dennis Matkosky
Songs written by Michael Sembello